Humberside was abolished in 1996 both as a county council and a ceremonial county, but the name Humberside continues to be used unofficially in subsequent boundary reviews as presented by the Boundary Commission for England to describe the area covered by the former county for the purpose of the rules which strongly deter cross-council constituencies (spanning more than one local authority within its area). The area covers the four unitary authorities of East Riding of Yorkshire, Hull, North Lincolnshire and North East Lincolnshire  The constituency boundaries used up to the 2005 United Kingdom general election were drawn up when it was a county. The area is divided into 10 parliamentary constituencies – 4 borough constituencies and 6 county constituencies.

Constituencies

2010 boundary changes
Under the Fifth Periodic Review of Westminster constituencies, the Boundary Commission for England decided to retain the 10 constituencies covering the former county of Humberside for the 2010 election, making minor changes to realign constituency boundaries with the boundaries of current local government wards.

Proposed boundary changes 
See 2023 Periodic Review of Westminster constituencies for further details.

Following the abandonment of the Sixth Periodic Review (the 2018 review), the Boundary Commission for England formally launched the 2023 Review on 5 January 2021. Initial proposals were published on 8 June 2021 and, following two periods of public consultation, revised proposals were published on 8 November 2022. Final proposals will be published by 1 July 2023.

The commission has proposed that Humberside be combined with South Yorkshire as a sub-region of the Yorkshire and the Humber Region, resulting in the creation of a new cross-county boundary constituency named Doncaster East and Axholme. Five current constituencies would be abolished (Brigg and Goole, Cleethorpes, East Yorkshire, Great Grimsby, and Haltemprice and Howden) and replaced by four new seats wholly within the area (Bridlington and The Wolds, Brigg and Immingham, Goole and Pocklington, and Great Grimsby and Cleethorpes).

The following constituencies are proposed:

Containing electoral wards from East Riding of Yorkshire

 Beverley and Holderness
 Bridlington and The Wolds
 Goole and Pocklington
 Kingston upon Hull North (part)
 Kingston upon Hull West and Hessle (part)

Containing electoral wards from Kingston upon Hull

 Kingston upon Hull East
 Kingston upon Hull North (part)
 Kingston upon Hull West and Hessle (part)

Containing electoral wards from North East Lincolnshire

 Brigg and Immingham (part)

 Great Grimsby and Cleethorpes

Containing electoral wards from North Lincolnshire

 Brigg and Immingham (part)

 Doncaster East and Axholme CC (part also in the South Yorkshire metropolitan borough of Doncaster)
 Scunthorpe CC

Results history
Primary data source: House of Commons research briefing - General election results from 1918 to 2019

2019 
The number of votes cast for each political party who fielded candidates in constituencies comprising Humberside in the 2019 general election were as follows:

Percentage votes 

11983 & 1987 - SDP-Liberal Alliance

* Included in Other

Seats 

11983 & 1987 - SDP-Liberal Alliance

Maps 

Maps shown prior to 1983 are for the East Riding of Yorkshire

Historical representation by party
Data given here is for the East Riding of Yorkshire before 1983. A cell marked → (with a different colour background to the preceding cell) indicates that the previous MP continued to sit under a new party name.

1885 to 1918

1918 to 1950

1950 to 1983

1983 to present

See also
 List of parliamentary constituencies in Yorkshire and the Humber

Notes

References

 
Humberside
Politics of the East Riding of Yorkshire
Politics of Lincolnshire